Sayonara is the twenty-sixth studio album released by German Schlager group Die Flippers. It was certified Gold.

Track listing
 "Sayonara"
 "Wenn am Horizont..." ("When on the Horizon...")
 "Mandolinen einer Sommernacht" ("Mandolins of a Summer Night")
 "Ein Tag, der mit Dir beginnt" ("A Day That Begins with You")
 "Tanz kleine Piroschka" ("Dance Little Piroschka")
 "Das letzte Souvenir" ("The Last Souvenir")
 "Niemand weint für immer" ("Nobody Cries Forever")
 "Rose der Südsee" ("Rose of the South Sea")
 "Ich bin einsam" ("I Am Alone")
 "Insel im Wind" ("Island in the Wind")
 "Himmelblau und Rosenrot" ("Sky Blue and Rose Red")
 "Sommernacht am Laggo Magorie" ("Summer Night at Lago Maggorie")
 "Ti amo Maria"
 "Prinzessin der Nacht" ("Princess of the Night")

Personnel
Olaf Malolepski - guitars, lead vocals
Bend Hengst - bass guitar, vocals
Manfred Durban - percussion, vocals

Charts

References

1994 albums
Die Flippers albums